The Homegrown Player Rule is an initiative of the English Premier League to allow for more domestic players to be developed from an earlier age in the hope of nurturing more homegrown talent. It forms part of the League's Elite Player Performance Plan.  The Premier League proposed a maximum of 17 non-"homegrown" players in each club squad, and the squad size is a maximum of 25. This means that in a full squad of 25 players, there must be at least eight homegrown players. Greg Dyke, the former chairman of the Football Association (FA), wanted to implement much stronger regulation of foreign players.  His intention was to help England to win the 2022 World Cup in Qatar, as he stated in an op-ed piece.

Some of the most significant of Dyke's 2015 proposals included: 
 Homegrown players in a top-flight 25-man squad be increased from eight to 12 two of whom must be brought up in the team's youth system
 Tightening the definition of what it is to be a homegrown player as a consequence fewer foreign-born players would qualify

Foreign-born, home-grown 
Currently, to be classified as homegrown one must be on an English team for at least three years before the age of twenty-one which Dyke wanted to reduce to eighteen. This would mean that a teenager would have to start at the club by the age of fifteen at the latest and, since players are not allowed to move across national boundaries before sixteen (except under exceptional circumstances), this would mean fewer foreign players could qualify as homegrown.

Each season the Premier League lists the squads for each of its clubs for the season on 1 September (after the summer transfer window closes). Each club is able to list up to 17 senior players that are not English or Welsh and did not spend a significant period in an English or Welsh academy, plus any number of homegrown players up to a maximum squad size of 25, plus an unlimited number of academy and under-21 players. For example, the list for 2017 contained a number of homegrown players who were not English or Welsh born or qualified, including Chelsea's Cesc Fàbregas (Spain) and Victor Moses (Nigeria), Manchester United's Paul Pogba (France) and Romelu Lukaku (Belgium), and Arsenal's Héctor Bellerín (Spain).

Brexit 
Miles Jacobson, director of Sports Interactive, the company behind the Football Manager, suggested that some EU-born players will not get work permits to work in the Premier League after Brexit. 152 current Premier League players who were born in the EU would probably not get a work permit if they are subjected to the same rules as non-EU players. Of the players who would not automatically qualify for work permits, they may qualify via the Football Association's Exceptions Panel.
Some football lobby groups are using the tax paid by footballers as a reason to press for an exclusion for EU players - while the opposite view was the basis for Dyke's original proposal, that by reducing foreign born players there would be more room for English players.

Since Brexit, clubs will not be able to sign players from overseas until they are 18. With this rule, overseas players can still become homegrown if they are signed at 18 years old and evolve 3 years on an English team, such as William Saliba.

References

Premier League rules and regulations